Lilial (a trade name for lily aldehyde, also known as lysmeral) is a chemical compound commonly used as a perfume in cosmetic preparations and laundry powders, often under the name butylphenyl methylpropional. It is a synthetic aromatic aldehyde. It was banned for use in cosmetics by the EU in March 2022 after being found to be harmful to fertility.

Synthesis
Lilial is produced at BASF through a double anodic oxidation of 4-tertbutyl-toluene on >10,000 ton per year scale.

Properties
Lilial is commonly produced and sold as a racemic mixture; however, testing has indicated that the different enantiomers of the compound do not contribute equally to its odor. The (R)-enantiomer has a strong floral odor, reminiscent of cyclamen or lily of the valley; whereas the (S)-enantiomer possesses no strong odor.

Like most aldehydes, lilial is not long term stable and tends to slowly oxidize on storage.

Safety
The Scientific Committee on Consumer Safety (SCCS, scientific committee for consumer safety of the EU Commission) concluded in May 2019 that the use of lilial in both rinse-off and leave-on cosmetics "cannot be considered as safe".

After animal studies found it to be toxic for reproduction, it was reclassified as a prohibited substance in the EU, and banned from use in cosmetics as of March 2022.

It can sometimes act as an allergen and may cause contact dermatitis in susceptible individuals.

See also
Helional
Bourgeonal

References 

Aldehydes
Perfume ingredients
Tert-butyl compounds